Angus Edmund Upton Maude, Baron Maude of Stratford-upon-Avon,  (8 September 1912 – 9 November 1993) was a British Conservative Party politician.  A Member of Parliament (MP) from 1950 to 1958 and from 1963 to 1983, he served as a cabinet minister from 1979 to 1981. He was the father of former Conservative MP Francis Maude.

Early life
Maude was born at 44 Temple Fortune Lane, Hendon, Middlesex, the only child of Alan Hamer Maude (1885–1979), journalist and army officer, and Dorothy Maude Upton, daughter of Frederic Upton, a civil servant. He was educated, mainly in Classics, at Rugby School, then attended Oriel College, Oxford, where he obtained a second-class degree in Politics, Philosophy and Economics in 1933. He became a journalist and author, working on The Times (1933–34) and the Daily Mail (1934–39).

Maude fought in the Second World War. He was captured in North Africa, becoming a POW in Italy. He was later moved to Germany, where he was freed by forces under General George S. Patton.

Parliamentary career
Maude was elected Conservative Party Member of Parliament for Ealing South at the 1950 general election. He continued to work in journalism, and was Director of the Conservative Political Centre from 1951 to 1955. In 1958, he resigned his seat to become editor of The Sydney Morning Herald, a post which he held until 1961. He attempted to return to Parliament, at first being beaten by the Labour Party's Guy Barnett by 704 votes in a 1962 by-election at South Dorset, where the Conservative vote was split. He was then elected to represent the constituency of Stratford-on-Avon in a a by-election in 1963, where he remained until retiring in 1983.

Maude was shadow aviation spokesman, but was sacked in 1967 by Edward Heath after criticising party policy. When Margaret Thatcher became leader, she brought him back into the fold after he played a key role in her bid for the leadership in 1975. When she came to power in May 1979, he was appointed to the position of Paymaster-General with a seat in the cabinet, with Thatcher saying "I was anxious to have Angus Maude in the Cabinet to benefit from his years of political experience, his sound views, and his acid wit." However, Maude resigned relatively soon afterward, in January 1981, following which he received a knighthood.

House of Lords
Maude gave up his seat at the 1983 general election, and was elevated to the House of Lords as a life peer on 19 September 1983, taking the title Baron Maude of Stratford-upon-Avon, of Stratford-upon-Avon in the County of Warwickshire. He died in 1993.

He was nicknamed "The Mekon" because of his prominent forehead and overbearing manner.

Writings

In 1955 Maude co-authored a book "The Biography of a Nation" with fellow Conservative MP, Enoch Powell.

References

External links
 Thatcher's First Cabinet
 

|-

|-

1912 births
1993 deaths
Alumni of Oriel College, Oxford
British male journalists
Conservative Party (UK) MPs for English constituencies
Conservative Party (UK) life peers
British expatriates in Australia
British newspaper editors
Maude family
Members of the Privy Council of the United Kingdom
People educated at Rugby School
UK MPs 1950–1951
UK MPs 1951–1955
UK MPs 1955–1959
UK MPs 1959–1964
UK MPs 1964–1966
UK MPs 1966–1970
UK MPs 1970–1974
UK MPs 1974
UK MPs 1974–1979
UK MPs 1979–1983
United Kingdom Paymasters General
The Sydney Morning Herald editors
Life peers created by Elizabeth II